Anasuyamma Gari Alludu is a 1986 Indian Telugu-language comedy film, produced by Nandamuri Harikrishna under the Ramakrishna Cine Studios banner and directed by A. Kodandarami Reddy. It stars Nandamuri Balakrishna, Bhanupriya, Sharada  and music composed by Chakravarthy. The film was remade in Tamil as Vairagyam starring Prabhu.

Plot
The film begins with luxurious uppity woman Anasuyamma and her haughty daughter Rukmini moving in her footsteps. Lokeswara Rao a foxy is the cousin brother of Anasuyamma and wants to usurp her wealth. Once, Rukmini squabbles with a mechanic Harikrishna which leads to wrangling with Anasuyamma and she is let down. Later with the guidance of her henpeck father Rukmini realizes and falls for Harikrishna. After a few comic incidents, Harikrishna learns through his mother Parvatamma that Anasuyamma is his maternal aunt i.e., sister of his father Srikanth. In the past direful Lokeswara Rao turns Srikanth into a dissipative whom Parvati reforms and he knits her. Here, Lokeswara Rao complots by sullying with the chastity of Parvati and driving to the suicide of Srikanth. Listening to it, Harikrishna pledges to prove his legitimacy. In tandem, aware of her daughter's love Anasuyamma fixes a rich alliance. Harikrishna breaks it up and takes Rukmini along with him. Anasuyamma makes various attempts to retrieve her but fails. Now, Harikrishna mocks & teases his aunt. Meanwhile, Lokeswara Rao backstabs Anasuyamma and she is apprehended. At last, Harikrishna rescues her and ceases Lokeswara Rao. Finally, the movie ends on a happy note with the marriage of Harikrishna & Rukmini.

Cast

Nandamuri Balakrishna as Harikrishna
Bhanupriya as Rukmini
Sharada as Anasuyamma
Rao Gopal Rao as Lokeswara Rao
Jaggayya as Anasuyamma's husband
Nutan Prasad as Varahalu
Chalapathi Rao as Inspector
Ramji as Ashok Kumar
Hema Sundar as Srikanth
Ramana Reddy as Long Long Ago Nukalu
Chitti Babu as Driver
Chidatala Appa Rao
Annapurna as Parvatamma
Rama Prabha as Achalamma
Dubbing Janaki as Lokeswara Rao's wife

Soundtrack

Music composed by Chakravarthy. Lyrics were written by Veturi. Music released on AVM Audio Company.

Other
 VCDs and DVDs on - Universal Videos, SHALIMAR Video Company, Hyderabad

References

External links
 

1986 films
Films directed by A. Kodandarami Reddy
Films scored by K. Chakravarthy
1980s Telugu-language films
Telugu films remade in other languages